Samoana conica is a species of tropical, air-breathing land snail, a terrestrial, pulmonate, gastropod mollusk in the family  Partulidae. This species is endemic to American Samoa.

References

C
Invertebrates of American Samoa
Molluscs of Oceania
Endangered fauna of Oceania
Taxa named by Augustus Addison Gould
Taxonomy articles created by Polbot